Little Bytham is a village and civil parish in the South Kesteven district of Lincolnshire, England. The population of the civil parish at the 2011 census was 384.

The East Coast Main Line railway cuts through the eastern side of the village over viaducts. On the edge of Little Bytham to the east is the West Glen River. Further east lie Witham on the Hill and Grimsthorpe Castle estate. To the west is Castle Bytham and, over the Rutland county boundary, is Clipsham. Careby is just to the south.

The name 'Bytham' is first recorded in 1067 (as a monastery that rapidly translated to Vaudey Abbey), and comes from the Old English word bythme meaning Valley bottom, broad valley.

Church of St Medard and St Gildard

The church is a Grade I listed building. It is dedicated to two 6th-century French saints, St Medard and St Gildard (or Medardus and Gildardus); the dedication is unique in the UK. Virtually unknown in Britain, St Medard is still well known in France, with at least 25 towns or villages named after him (as St Médard or St Méard). Gildard, thought to be his brother, is less well known. The village fête is held annually on or near St Medard's feast day, 8 June.

The earliest parts of the building are some Anglo-Saxon "long-and-short" stonework, visible externally at the southeast and southwest corners (quoins) of the nave. The church also has several Romanesque details dating from the Norman era, including a Priest's Door ("uncommonly ornate", according to Nikolaus Pevsner) with a finely carved tympanum; the empty circular niche in the tympanum is said to have held a relic; the birds in roundels to either side are probably eagles, as one is legendarily supposed to have sheltered Medard from the rain. Also Norman are the plain, undecorated arch into the tower, and the north door (late 12th century).

The south aisle and the upper parts of the tower and spire are 13th century work; the intersecting tracery of the east window of the south aisle shows that it is slightly later, dating from around 1300, as does the nearby piscina. The chancel arch is probably also from the late 13th century, and the double piscina in the chancel may be of a similar age. The Easter Sepulchre in the chancel is in the slightly later (Decorated) style, but is a fairly crude example. A finely sculpted capital depicting a Green Man surrounded by oak leaves, similar to examples at nearby Kirkby Underwood and Greatford, also dates from c.1300. It is no longer in position, having been built into a wall, face inwards, and rediscovered during later restoration work.

The stone base of the pulpit is dated 1590, and has a Latin inscription Orate et parate ("Pray and prepare"). Pevsner mistakenly gives this as Orate et Arate.

Railway and other industrial history

The Great Northern Railway main line (now the East Coast Main Line) and the Midland and Great Northern Joint Railway (closed 1959) crossed here. The GNR had powers to make a junction but never did so. Little Bytham railway station on the GNR closed in 1959, and most of its buildings have since been demolished. There was no station here on the M&GNJR, the nearest being Castle Bytham railway station. From 1857 to 1884, Little Bytham station was the junction for the Edenham & Little Bytham Railway branch line to Edenham.

Remains of the M&GNJR and E&LBR are still visible, most obviously near the junction of the road from Little Bytham to Witham on the Hill, where there is a large M&GN embankment with a road bridge across the B1176  and a river bridge across the River Glen within a quarter of a mile , with an E&LBR cutting and road bridge a little further up the hill  to the east.

The LNER Class A4 4468 Mallard locomotive made its record-breaking run south through the village on 3 July 1938. It reached , the fastest ever officially recorded for a steam locomotive, just south of the village at milepost 90¼, where a sign beside the track was erected in 1998 to mark the 60th anniversary of the event, and the exact spot (between Aunby and Carlby) in Lincolnshire where The Mallard reached its highest speed.

There were earlier claims to this speed, notably by the Great Western locomotive 3440 City of Truro, but this 1933 run is generally considered to be the first reliably recorded instance. On a later trial run to Newcastle upon Tyne and back in 1935, A3 number 2750 Papyrus reached  hauling 217 tons at the same spot, maintaining a speed above  for 12.5 consecutive miles (20.1 km), the world record for a non-streamlined locomotive.

A brickworks north of the village, established in 1850 and active into the early 20th century, made small, high-fired paving bricks, called "Adamantine Clinkers" (because of their hardness), for paving stables and other floors. The works are mentioned in the Lincolnshire article in the 1911 Encyclopædia Britannica. They advertised that they had won Gold and Silver medals, and supplied "His Majesty the King and other members of the Royal Family; also to the principal Nobility of this and Foreign Countries." The works are now demolished and houses have been built on the site.

Community
Former clay workings, an uneven area now overgrown with woodland, has been developed as The Spinney, a nature reserve, picnic site and children's adventure playground, through a grant from the Millennium Commission. A Heritage Orchard, with historic, mainly local, cultivars of apples, pears, plums, cherries and gages, has been planted at the site and a small sensory garden is also being developed.

Mixed arable farming is still carried out around the village. In 2000–02, a local farm suffered cross contamination from nearby GM trials.

There is a village hall, a motor engineer, a stonemason and a garden nursery. The village telephone box has been earmarked for closure

The former Mallard pub in the centre of the village, named after the record-breaking locomotive, closed in 2002; it was previously called the Green Man.

References

External links
 
 theBythams.org.uk, village web site
 "Little Bytham", Homepages.which.net
 Free Play Network newsletter  with article about The Spinney
 The Spinney website
 
 

Villages in Lincolnshire
Civil parishes in Lincolnshire
Bytham